Yonathan Alexis Rodríguez Benítez (born 1 July 1993) is a Uruguayan professional footballer who plays as a defensive midfielder for Club Nacional de Football on loan from Club Sportivo Cerrito.

Career
Rodríguez is from a humble background in Montevideo, one of five children. Whilst playing at Palma De Flores Baby Futbol Club he would sometimes have to go to training without having first had breakfast. Rodríguez came through the ranks at Club Sportivo Cerrito playing as a defensive midfielder.

He made his debut against Boston River on 12 October 2013 in a 0-0 draw in the Uruguayan Segunda División. He stayed with the club despite relegation to Uruguayan third division in 2014-15. In the third division they played for one season and over the following seasons reached the promotion playoffs on more than one occasion before achieving promotion from the Segunda Division as champions in 2020. Rodríguez made a total of 146 appearances league and scored 9 goals for the senior Cerrito side prior to joining Nacional aged 28 in January 2022 on a one year loan deal. The deal contained a stipulation for a second season should he play a minimum of 60% of their matches.
 
With Nacional he made his debut in the Copa Libertadores, starting all six of their games, as well as making three appearances in the Copa Sudamerica. He was part of their title-winning 2022 Uruguayan Primera División season. From the first 50 games available to him in all competitions he secured 33 starts plus 3 substitute appearances to ensure an automatic second season with Nacional as stated in his contract.

Honours
Club Sportivo Cerrito
Uruguayan Segunda División:2020

Nacional
Uruguayan Primera División: 2022

References

External links
 

1993 births
Living people
Association football midfielders
Uruguayan footballers 
Club Nacional de Football players
Uruguayan Primera División players
Footballers from Montevideo